Gonzalo Diego Bueno Bingola (born 16 January 1993) is a Uruguayan footballer who plays as a winger for Liverpool. He also played for the Uruguay U20 national team. Besides Uruguay, he has played in Russia, Portugal, Colombia, and Spain.

Club career

Nacional
Born in Maldonado, Bueno was a Nacional youth graduate. He made his first team – and Primera División – debut on 4 June 2011, in a 2–0 home loss against Rampla Juniors.

Bueno scored his first professional goal in his second appearance for the main squad on 18 September 2011, netting his team's second in a 4–0 home routing of Cerro Largo. He subsequently became a regular starter for the side.

Kuban Krasnodar
On 22 August 2013, Bueno signed for Russia's FC Kuban Krasnodar on a long-term contract. On 25 December 2014, after being rarely used and struggling with injuries, he was loaned to former club Nacional for six months.

On 29 August 2015, Bueno joined Primeira Liga side C.F. União also in a temporary deal, but the loan was cut short in December after only two appearances.

Back to South America
Bueno signed for Colombian side Patriotas Boyacá in late 2015, being immediately loaned to Estudiantes de la Plata for 18 months. In the following campaigns, he represented Defensor Sporting, Nacional and Colón, always in temporary deals.

Almería
On 22 July 2019, free agent Bueno signed a two-year contract with Segunda División side UD Almería, with an option for a third. He revoked his contract on 27 August 2019 following a change in the club's ownership and managerial staff.

Personal life
Bueno's father Gustavo and cousins Gastón and Santiago have also played football professionally. Gustavo has most recently acted as manager of Sud América, while Gastón and Santi play for Montevideo Wanderers and Girona respectively.

References

External links
 
 

1993 births
Living people
People from Maldonado, Uruguay
Uruguayan footballers
Association football forwards
Uruguayan Primera División players
Club Nacional de Football players
Defensor Sporting players
Russian Premier League players
FC Kuban Krasnodar players
Primeira Liga players
C.F. União players
Argentine Primera División players
Chilean Primera División players
Estudiantes de La Plata footballers
Club Atlético Colón footballers
UD Almería players
Universidad de Concepción footballers
Uruguay under-20 international footballers
Uruguayan expatriate footballers
Uruguayan expatriate sportspeople in Russia
Uruguayan expatriate sportspeople in Portugal
Uruguayan expatriate sportspeople in Argentina
Uruguayan expatriate sportspeople in Spain
Uruguayan expatriate sportspeople in Chile
Expatriate footballers in Russia
Expatriate footballers in Portugal
Expatriate footballers in Argentina
Expatriate footballers in Spain
Expatriate footballers in Chile